Denis Moiseychenkov (born 21 May 1986) is a Russian bobsledder who has competed since 2007. His best World Cup finish was third in a four-man event at Altenberg, Germany in December 2009.

Moiseychenkov finished eighth in the four-man event at the 2010 Winter Olympics in Vancouver.

References
 

1986 births
Bobsledders at the 2010 Winter Olympics
Living people
Olympic bobsledders of Russia
People from Zima (town)
Russian male bobsledders
Sportspeople from Irkutsk Oblast